Payne Township may refer to:

 Payne Township, Gove County, Kansas
 Payne Township, Sedgwick County, Kansas

	
Township name disambiguation pages